Fred Kirschenmann (born February 4, 1935) is an American professor, organic farmer, and a leader in the sustainable agriculture movement. He is board president of Stone Barns Center for Food and Agriculture and the former director of the Leopold Center for Sustainable Agriculture. He is considered "one of the most prominent spokesmen for the sustainable farming movement."

Early life and education
Frederick Ludwig Kirschenmann was born in Medina, North Dakota. He grew up on his family's farm in Windsor, North Dakota. He received his undergraduate degree at Yankton College. He attended the Hartford Theological Seminary. He earned a PhD in philosophy from the University of Chicago.

He began his career teaching religion and philosophy at Yankton College. He then went on to be director of the Consortium for Higher Education Religion Studies (CHERS) in Dayton, Ohio. He then became a dean at Curry College.

Career
In 1970, while working as an instructor and administrator at CHERS, he was struck by his student David Vetter's research showing how heavy doses of nitrogen fertilizer lead to the deterioration of soil. Vetter found that the heavy use of chemical inputs in conventional farming created what he called a "chemical treadmill": "Farmers would use a pesticide, then find the next year that bugs had grown resistant, forcing them to resort to newer, more expensive products."

In 1976, after his father suffered a heart attack, Fred offered to move back to the farm, on the condition that he could run it organically. The farm was certified organic in 1980. It is planted with diverse crops to allow for crop rotation that has allowed him to farm productively without synthetic fertilizers or pesticides, creating a rich deep soil.

Once establishing his farm, Kirschenmann returned to academia and worked for several different nonprofit organizations in order to advance the cause of sustainable agriculture.

In 1979, he helped found and served as the first president of the Northern Plains Sustainable Agriculture Society from 1983 to 1988.

In 1994, he joined the board of the Henry A. Wallace Institute for Alternative Agriculture. In 1997, He became its president.

Kirschenmann served as the director of the Leopold Center for Sustainable Agriculture from July 2000 to November 2005. He currently holds the position of distinguished fellow.

He has been an advisor and been interviewed for several documentaries including American Meat, Dreaming of a Vetter World, and Symphony of the Soil.

He has been appointed to USDA’s National Organic Standards Board and the National Commission on Industrial Farm Animal Production operated by the Johns Hopkins School of Public Health.

Awards and honors
Kirschenmann has received numerous honors and awards for his work, including the 2011 James Beard Foundation Leadership award, the 2012 Sustainable Agriculture Achievement Award from Practical Farmers of Iowa, the 2014 Lifetime Achievement Award from the International Federation of Organic Agriculture Movements (IFOAM), the 2014 One World Award for Lifetime Achievement, and the 2014 Thought Leader award from the Natural Resources Defense Council.

Stone Barns marked Kirschenmann’s 80th birthday by launching the annual Kirschenmann Lecture at its campus. The inaugural lecture was given by writer Wendell Berry.

Books and publications
In April 2010, a collection of his essays Cultivating an Ecological Conscience: Essays from a Farmer Philosopher was published by the University Press of Kentucky.

Personal life
He is married to the environmental lawyer Carolyn Raffensperger. He was previously married to Edith Maria Hults. 

He has two children, Ann Marie and Damon Frederick.

References

External links
Writings by Fred Kirschenmann from the Leopold Center Writings by Fred Kirschenmann | Leopold Center for Sustainable Agriculture
Writings by Fred Kirschenmann at In These Times Fred Kirschenmann
National Agricultural Library https://www.nal.usda.gov/afsic/fred-kirschenmann
https://www.imdb.com/name/nm4853937/
https://www.leopold.iastate.edu/people/frederick-kirschenmann

Living people
1935 births
University of Chicago alumni
Writers from North Dakota
People from Stutsman County, North Dakota
American agricultural writers
American environmentalists
Farmers from North Dakota
Iowa State University faculty
Organic farmers